Erko Jonne Tõugjas (born 5 July 2003) is an Estonian professional footballer who currently plays as a centre-back for Meistriliiga club Flora and the Estonia national team.

International career
Tõugjas made his senior international debut for Estonia on 8 January 2023, in a 1–1 draw against Iceland in a friendly.

Honours

Club
Nõmme United
Esiliiga B: 2019

Flora
Estonian Supercup: 2021

References

External links

2003 births
Living people
Footballers from Tallinn
Estonian footballers
Association football defenders
Esiliiga B players
Esiliiga players
Meistriliiga players
FC Nõmme United players
FC Flora players
Tallinna JK Legion players
Estonia youth international footballers
Estonia under-21 international footballers
Estonia international footballers